The Untouchables of Elliot Mouse is a 1996–1997 26-episode half-hour television animated series loosely inspired by the real life Eliot Ness, and his group of agents colloquially known as the Untouchables, and their investigation into the real life gangster Al Capone, although (as with past adaptations) it does take some liberties with history. The series also parodies the violent atmosphere of Chicago during the Dry Law, as well as the old American films, their heroes and villains. The main characters in this series are four friendly mice: Elliot "Mouse", Gordon, Mr. Wilson, and Jack the Irishman, although there are also some cats and dogs.

Plot
The citizens of "Cheesecago" are defenceless against "Al Catone's" mobsters until a few brave federal agents from the "Federal Mousehole of Investigation" headed by "Elliot Mouse" dare to take on the gangsters. In spite of their rivalry and continuous fights, they control gambling, shows, races and every business in town. They charge poor people and terrified traders with high taxes; they rob, and kidnap, but their biggest racket is in confiscating cheese and then deal with it illegally so that it fetches very high prices, often causing Cheesecago citizens to get ripped off.

Episode
Cheesecago: City without Law
Moony's Big Haul
The First Raids
The Cheese Trail
Doubles or Nothing
The Informer
A Day at the Races
Ma Wilson
The Perfect Holdup
The Greater the Fall
The Starlette
The Cheesecago Express
Escape from Catatraz
The Trap
The Code of Silence
Like Dog and Cat
The Public Enemy
A Present from Santa Mouse
The Loot goes Flying
The School of Crime
Their Days are Numbered
The Stolen Armstrong
Gems and Diamonds
While the City Sleeps
The Kidnapping
A Matter of Taxes

Special
 Happy 20th Anniversary to The Untouchables of Elliot Mouse!
 The Untouchables vs Al Catone (Full Movie)

Release
The first 9 episodes were released on DVD in the UK.
In somewhere in late 2013 to early 2014, the complete series of The Untouchables of Elliot Mouse will be released on DVD in the UK.

References

External links

BRB Internacional

1997 Spanish television series debuts
1997 Spanish television series endings
Spanish children's animated television series
Australian Broadcasting Corporation original programming
Animated television series about mice and rats
Films about Al Capone
Chicago in fiction
1990s Spanish television series
1990s animated television series
1990s children's television series
The Untouchables